Demos is a compilation of demos and non-album tracks by Imperial Drag, released on May 2, 2005. Five additional tracks were subsequently made available exclusively through the Not Lame Recordings website.

The album was distributed through the (now defunct) Weedshare music distribution service.

Track listing

External links

Imperial Drag albums
Demo albums
2005 compilation albums